Durand is an unincorporated community in Woodson County, Kansas, United States.

Education
The community is served by Woodson USD 366 public school district.

References

Further reading

External links
 Woodson County maps: Current, Historic, KDOT

Unincorporated communities in Woodson County, Kansas
Unincorporated communities in Kansas